Cottan-Bimbang is a national park in New South Wales, Australia, 443 km north of Sydney and 65 km south east of Walcha and was formerly a state forest. The Oxley Highway crosses the park south of Werrikimbe National Park. Myrtle Scrub Road is a 15 kilometre circuit in the west of the park that connects with the Oxley Highway.

Flora and fauna
This park is situated on the eastern escarpment with extensive tall old-growth eucalypt forest, rainforest, threatened frog species, yellow-bellied gliders (Petaurus australis) and koalas. 'Cottan-bimbang' is the local Aboriginal word for the walking stick palm (Linospadix monostachya), which grows in the park's temperate rainforests.

Blackberries (Rubus) are creating a serious weed problem in the park.

There is a barbecue area, picnic area and public toilets at Stockyard Creek on the Oxley Highway and a cleared area for picnics next to Cells River on Myrtle Scrub Road. There is a cleared area for camping at Maxwells Flat on the Causeway Road, and a long drop toilet.

See also
 Protected areas of New South Wales

References

National parks of New South Wales
Protected areas established in 1999
1999 establishments in Australia